Francesco Cornaro, iuniore (1547–1598) was a Roman Catholic cardinal who served as Bishop of Treviso (1577–1595).

Episcopal succession
While bishop, he was the principal consecrator of:
Alvise Cornaro (bishop), Titular Bishop of Paphus and Coadjutor Bishop of Padua (1589);
and the principal co-consecrator of:
Gianfrancesco Morosini, Bishop of Brescia (1585);
Antonio Grimani (patriarch), Bishop of Torcello (1587);
Alessandro Centurione, Archbishop of Genoa (1591)
Marco Cornaro (bishop), Bishop of Padua (1594); and 
Camillo Borghese, Bishop of Jesi (1597).

References

1547 births
1598 deaths
16th-century Italian cardinals
16th-century Roman Catholic bishops in the Republic of Venice